Ben Townsend (born 8 October 1981) is an English footballer who played in the Football League for Wycombe Wanderers.

Townsend was born in Reading, Berkshire, and attended Chiltern Edge School. He has played for Wycombe Wanderers, Woking, Farnborough Town, Maidenhead United and Basingstoke Town. He played in the Wycombe Wanderers side that faced Liverpool in the FA Cup Semi-Final of 2001.

References

1981 births
Living people
Sportspeople from Reading, Berkshire
English footballers
Association football defenders
Wycombe Wanderers F.C. players
Woking F.C. players
Farnborough F.C. players
Maidenhead United F.C. players
Basingstoke Town F.C. players
English Football League players
Footballers from Berkshire